The Downtown Arts Scene was an artistic community based in New York City's Downtown area. 

Members of the Scene included Alvin Baltrop, Jackie Curtis, Jasper Johns, Trisha Brown and Philip Glass.

The Downtown arts scene used photocopying as a rapid way for artists to share and distribute images.

The Downtown Arts Scene is generally considered to have reached its end in the 1980s.

References 

American artist groups and collectives
Cultural history of New York City